Seborrhoeic dermatitis, sometimes inaccurately referred to as seborrhoea, is a long-term skin disorder. Symptoms include red, scaly, greasy, itchy, and inflamed skin. Areas of the skin rich in oil-producing glands are often affected including the scalp, face, and chest. It can result in social or self-esteem problems. In babies, when the scalp is primarily involved, it is called cradle cap. Dandruff is a milder form of the condition without inflammation.

The cause is unclear but believed to involve a number of genetic and environmental factors. Risk factors include poor immune function, Parkinson's disease, and alcoholic pancreatitis. The condition may worsen with stress or during the winter. The Malassezia yeast is believed to play a role. It is not a result of poor hygiene. Diagnosis is typically based on the symptoms. The condition is not contagious.

The typical treatment is antifungal cream and anti-inflammatory agents. Specifically, ketoconazole or ciclopirox are effective. It is unclear if other antifungals, such as miconazole, are equally effective as they have been poorly studied. Other options may include salicylic acid, coal tar, benzoyl peroxide, and phototherapy.

The condition is most common in infants within the first 3 months or in adults aged 30 to 70 years. In adults between 1% and 10% of people are affected. Males are more often affected than females. Up to 70% of babies may be affected at some point in time.

Signs and symptoms

Seborrhoeic dermatitis' symptoms appear gradually, and usually the first signs are flaky skin and scalp. Symptoms occur most commonly anywhere on the skin of the scalp, behind the ears, on the face, and in areas where the skin folds. Flakes may be yellow, white or grayish. Redness and flaking may also occur on the skin near the eyelashes, on the forehead, around the sides of the nose, on the chest, and on the upper back.

In more severe cases, yellowish to reddish scaly pimples appear along the hairline, behind the ears, in the ear canal, on the eyebrows, on the bridge of the nose, around the nose, on the chest, and on the upper back.

Commonly, patients experience mild redness, scaly skin lesions and in some cases hair loss. Other symptoms include patchy scaling or thick crusts on the scalp, red, greasy skin covered with flaky white or yellow scales, itching, soreness and yellow or white scales that may attach to the hair shaft.

Seborrhoeic dermatitis can occur in infants younger than three months and it causes a thick, oily, yellowish crust around the hairline and on the scalp. Itching is not common among infants. Frequently, a stubborn diaper rash accompanies the scalp rash.

Causes
The cause of seborrhoeic dermatitis has not been fully clarified.

In addition to the presence of Malassezia, genetic, environmental, hormonal, and immune-system factors are necessary for and/or modulate the expression of seborrhoeic dermatitis. The condition may be aggravated by illness, psychological stress, fatigue, sleep deprivation, change of season, and reduced general health. In children and babies, excessive vitamin A intake or issues with Δ6-desaturase enzymes have been correlated with increased risk. Seborrhoeic dermatitis-like eruptions are also associated with vitamin B6 deficiency. Those with immunodeficiency (especially infection with HIV) and with neurological disorders such as Parkinson's disease (for which the condition is an autonomic sign) and stroke are particularly prone to it.

Climate
Low humidity and low temperature are responsible for high frequency of seborrheic dermatitis.

Fungi
The condition is thought to be due to a local inflammatory response to over-colonization by Malassezia fungi species in sebum-producing skin areas including the scalp, face, chest, back, underarms, and groin. This is based on observations of high counts of Malassezia species in skin affected by seborrhoeic dermatitis and on the effectiveness of antifungals in treating the condition. Such species of Malassezia include M. furfur (formerly Pityrosporum ovale), M. globosa, M. restricta, M. sympodialis, and M. slooffiae. Although Malassezia appears to be the central predisposing factor in seborrhoeic dermatitis, it is thought that other factors are necessary for the presence of Malassezia to result in the pathology characteristic of the condition. This is based on the fact that summer growth of Malassezia in the skin alone does not result in seborrhoeic dermatitis. Besides antifungals, the effectiveness of anti-inflammatory drugs, which reduce inflammation, and antiandrogens, which reduce sebum production, provide further insights into the pathophysiology of seborrhoeic dermatitis.

Management

Humidity
A humidifier can be used to prevent low indoor humidity during winter (especially with indoor heating), and dry season. And a dehumidifier can be used during seasons with excessive humidity.

Medications
A variety of different types of medications are able to reduce symptoms of seborrhoeic dermatitis. These include certain antifungals, anti-inflammatory agents like corticosteroids and nonsteroidal anti-inflammatory drugs, antiandrogens, and antihistamines, among others.

Antifungals
Regular use of an over-the-counter or prescription antifungal shampoo or cream may help those with recurrent episodes. The topical antifungal medications ketoconazole and ciclopirox have the best evidence. It is unclear if other antifungals are equally effective as this has not been sufficiently studied. Antifungals that have been studied and found to be effective in the treatment of seborrhoeic dermatitis include ketoconazole, fluconazole, miconazole, bifonazole, sertaconazole, clotrimazole, flutrimazole, ciclopirox, terbinafine, butenafine, selenium sulfide, and lithium salts such as lithium gluconate and lithium succinate. Topical climbazole appears to have little effectiveness in the treatment of seborrhoeic dermatitis. Systemic therapy with oral antifungals including itraconazole, fluconazole, ketoconazole, and terbinafine is effective.

Anti-inflammatory treatments
Topical corticosteroids have been shown to be effective in short-term treatment of seborrhoeic dermatitis and are as effective or more effective than antifungal treatment with azoles. There is also evidence for the effectiveness of calcineurin inhibitors like tacrolimus and pimecrolimus as well as lithium salt therapy.

Oral immunosuppressive treatment, such as with prednisone, has been used in short courses for seborrhoeic dermatitis, as a last resort due to its potential side effects.

Antiandrogens
Seborrhoea, which is sometimes associated with seborrhoeic dermatitis, is recognized as an androgen-sensitive condition – that is, it is caused or aggravated by androgen sex hormones such as testosterone and dihydrotestosterone – and is a common symptom of hyperandrogenism (e.g., that seen in polycystic ovary syndrome). In addition, seborrhoea, as well as acne, are commonly associated with puberty due to the steep increase of androgen levels at that time.

In accordance with the involvement of androgens in seborrhoea, antiandrogens, such as cyproterone acetate, spironolactone, flutamide, and nilutamide, are highly effective in alleviating the condition. As such, they are used in the treatment of seborrhoea, particularly severe cases. While beneficial in seborrhoea, effectiveness may vary with different antiandrogens; for instance, spironolactone (which is regarded as a relatively weak antiandrogen) has been found to produce a 50% improvement after three months of treatment, whereas flutamide has been found to result in an 80% improvement within three months. Cyproterone acetate, similarly more potent and effective than spironolactone, results in considerable improvement or disappearance of acne and seborrhoea in 90% of patients within three months.

Systemic antiandrogen therapy is generally used to treat seborrhoea only in women, not in men, as these medications can result in feminization (e.g., gynecomastia), sexual dysfunction, and infertility in males. In addition, antiandrogens theoretically have the potential to feminize male fetuses in pregnant women and, for this reason, are usually combined with effective birth control in sexually active women who can or may become pregnant.

Antihistamines
Antihistamines are used primarily to reduce itching, if present. However, research studies suggest that some antihistamines have anti-inflammatory properties.

Other treatments
 Coal tar can be effective. Although no significant increased risk of cancer in human treatment with coal tar shampoos has been found, caution is advised since coal tar is carcinogenic in animals, and heavy human occupational exposures do increase cancer risks.
 Isotretinoin, a sebosuppressive agent, may be used to reduce sebaceous gland activity as a last resort in refractory disease. However, isotretinoin has potentially serious side effects, and few patients with seborrhoeic dermatitis are appropriate candidates for therapy.
 Keratolytics like topical urea
 Metronidazole
 Topical 4% nicotinamide

Phototherapy

Another potential option is natural and artificial UV radiation since it can curb the growth of Malassezia yeast. Some recommend photodynamic therapy using UV-A and UV-B laser or red and blue LED light to inhibit the growth of Malassezia fungus and reduce seborrhoeic inflammation.

Epidemiology
Seborrhoeic dermatitis affects 1 to 5% of the general population. It is slightly more common in men, but affected women tend to have more severe symptoms. The condition usually recurs throughout a person's lifetime. Seborrhoeic dermatitis can occur in any age group but usually starts at puberty and peaks in incidence at around 40 years of age. It can reportedly affect as many as 31% of older people. Severity is worse in dry climates.  Seborrhoeic dermatitis is common in people with alcoholism, between 7 and 11 percent, which is twice the normal expected occurrence.

See also 
 Seborrheic keratosis
Eczema herpeticum, condition that primarily manifests in childhood

References

External links 

 American Academy of Dermatology: Seborrheic dermatitis

 
Wikipedia medicine articles ready to translate